Party Time is an Australian television series which aired 1963 on what would eventually become the Seven Network. A daytime game show aired on Sundays, the first episode aired on 5 May 1963. The show featured two segments, "Letter Box Game" and "Double Your Money" It was hosted by Bill Acfield and featured Myra Roper. It appears to have been a follow-up to Letter Box.

It is not known if any of the episodes still exist, given the wiping of the era.

It should not be confused with Tivoli Party Time, which aired in Melbourne on HSV-7.

References

External links
 

1963 Australian television series debuts
1963 Australian television series endings
Black-and-white Australian television shows
1960s Australian game shows
English-language television shows
Seven Network original programming
Television game shows with incorrect disambiguation